, also referred to as just , is a Japanese manga artist, video game artist and character designer.

Biography
Upon graduating from art design college, he first began working on advertisement designs, but in 1998 subsequently changed careers to become a manga/anime style artist. Soon after, he began illustrating for numerous eroge and designing their characters, thus quickly gaining himself renown and popularity. Apart from his illustration work, which has since encompassed designing general games such as the recent iterations of Sega's popular Shining roleplaying game series, he is also executive director of his own company, RPM Y.K.

Works

General games
Street Slam
Ghostlop
Tempest

Shining Tears
Shining Wind
Shining Hearts
Shining Blade
Shining Ark
Exstetra
Shining Resonance
Valhellio
Azur Lane

Rated 18 Series

After...

Light novels

Dōjinshi
 (Stellvia of the Universe)
Unfinished (Princess Crown)
 (Ragnarok Online)
Runar! (Mobile Suit Gundam Seed Destiny)
 (Bleach)
 (Zoids: Genesis)
 (Fate/stay night)
 (Zegapain)
 (Hayate no Gotoku)
 (Bamboo Blade)
 (Bakemonogatari)
 (Macross Frontier)
 (Clannad)

Artbooks
Tony's Art Works Graph I to IV (Limited-edition release in Taiwan)

Sources:

References

External links
RPM Co., Ltd.
T2 Art Works
T2 Art Works on Tokyo Otaku Mode
SP-Janis
Shining Tears
Shining Wind
Shining World

Video game artists
Japanese video game designers
Anime character designers
1971 births
Living people
Manga artists from Miyagi Prefecture